Albuna is a genus of moths in the family Sesiidae.

Species
Albuna fraxini (Edwards, 1881) – Virginia creeper clearwing
Albuna pyramidalis (Walker, 1856)
Albuna bicaudata  Eichlin, 1989
Albuna polybiaformis  Eichlin, 1989
Albuna rufibasilaris  Eichlin, 1989

References

Sesiidae